Tiberias Municipal Stadium (HaItztadion HaIroni Shel Tverya), is a football stadium currently being built in Tiberias for Ironi Tiberias F.C., the football team of the town, and will replace the old stadium located downtown. Once completed, the new stadium will include 7,554 seats. It is located at the southern entrance to the city, near the junction of Poriya Hospital as a part of a sports complex also including a multi-purpose 2,500-seat sports hall, a training field and a swimming pool. As of late 2020, the project was frozen due to lack of funds.

Gallery

See also
 High-tech architecture

References
 New design: The turtle stadium of Tiberias, StadiumDB.com 17.4.2016 
 L'Ironi Tiberias FC va s'offrir un nouveau stade 1.2.2015 (in Français)
 עירוני טבריה משתדרגת: אצטדיון חדש יוקם בעיר  5.12.2014 (in Hebrew)
 Tiberias Municipal Stadium in the Youtube אצטדיון עירוני טבריה החדש (in Hebrew) 4.12.2014
 לפעמים חלומות מתגשמים: אצטדיון חדש יוקם בטבריה Best ball (in Hebrew) 4.12.2014

External links
 List of High-tech Buildings

 
Multi-purpose stadiums in Israel
Football venues in Israel
Stadiums under construction
Sports venues in Northern District (Israel)
Sport in Tiberias